Memantine is a medication used to slow the progression of moderate-to-severe Alzheimer's disease. It is taken by mouth.

Common side effects include headache, constipation, sleepiness, and dizziness. Severe side effects may include blood clots, psychosis, and heart failure. It is believed to work by acting on NMDA receptors, working as pore blockers of these ion channels.

Memantine was approved for medical use in the United States in 2003. It is available as a generic medication. In 2020, it was the 152nd most commonly prescribed medication in the United States, with more than 3million prescriptions.

Medical use

Alzheimer's disease and dementia
Memantine is used to treat moderate-to-severe Alzheimer's disease, especially for people who are intolerant of or have a contraindication to AChE (acetylcholinesterase) inhibitors. One guideline recommends memantine or an AChE inhibitor be considered in people in the early-to-mid stage of dementia.

Memantine has been associated with a modest improvement; with small positive effects on cognition, mood, behavior, and the ability to perform daily activities in moderate-to-severe Alzheimer's disease. There does not appear to be any benefit in mild disease.

Memantine when added to donepezil in those with moderate-to-severe dementia resulted in "limited improvements" in a 2017 review. The UK National Institute of Clinical Excellence (NICE) issued guidance in 2018 recommending consideration of the combination of memantine with donepezil in those with moderate-to-severe dementia.

Psychiatry

Bipolar disorder
Memantine has been investigated as a possible augmentation strategy for depression in bipolar disorder but meta-analytic evidence does not support its clinical utility.

Autism
Effects in autism are unclear.

Adverse effects 
Memantine is, in general, well tolerated. Common adverse drug reactions (≥1% of people) include confusion, dizziness, drowsiness, headache, insomnia, agitation, and/or hallucinations. Less common adverse effects include vomiting, anxiety, hypertonia, cystitis, and increased libido.

Like many other NMDA antagonists, memantine behaves as a dissociative anesthetic at supratherapeutic doses. Despite isolated reports, recreational use of memantine is rare due to the drug's long duration and limited availability. Also memantine seems to lack effects such as euphoria or hallucinations.

Memantine appears to be generally well tolerated by children with autism spectrum disorder.

Pharmacology

Glutamate 
A dysfunction of glutamatergic neurotransmission, manifested as neuronal excitotoxicity, is hypothesized to be involved in the etiology of Alzheimer's disease. Targeting the glutamatergic system, specifically NMDA receptors, offers a novel approach to treatment in view of the limited efficacy of existing drugs targeting the cholinergic system.

Memantine is a low-affinity voltage-dependent uncompetitive antagonist at glutamatergic NMDA receptors. By binding to the NMDA receptor with a higher affinity than Mg2+ ions, memantine is able to inhibit the prolonged influx of Ca2+ ions, particularly from extrasynaptic receptors, which forms the basis of neuronal excitotoxicity. The low affinity, uncompetitive nature, and rapid off-rate kinetics of memantine at the level of the NMDA receptor-channel, however, preserves the function of the receptor at synapses, as it can still be activated by physiological release of glutamate following depolarization of the postsynaptic neuron. The interaction of memantine with NMDA receptors plays a major role in the symptomatic improvement that the drug produces in Alzheimer's disease. However, there is no evidence as yet that the ability of memantine to protect against extrasynaptic NMDA receptor-mediated excitotoxicity has a disease-modifying effect in Alzheimer's, although this has been suggested in animal models.

Memantine's antagonism on NMDA receptors has aroused interest in repurposing it for mental illnesses such as bipolar disorder, considering the involvement of the glutamatergic system in the pathophysiology of mood disorders.

Serotonin 
Memantine acts as a non-competitive antagonist at the 5-HT3 receptor, with a potency similar to that for the NMDA receptor. Many 5-HT3 antagonists function as antiemetics, however the clinical significance of this serotonergic activity in the treatment of Alzheimer's disease is unknown.

Cholinergic 
Memantine acts as a non-competitive antagonist at different neuronal nicotinic acetylcholine receptors (nAChRs) at potencies possibly similar to the NMDA and 5-HT3 receptors, but this is difficult to ascertain with accuracy because of the rapid desensitization of nAChR responses in these experiments. It can be noted that memantine is an antagonist at Alpha-7 nAChR, which may contribute to initial worsening of cognitive function during early memantine treatment. Alpha-7 nAChR upregulates quickly in response to antagonism, which could explain the cognitive-enhancing effects of chronic memantine treatment. It has been shown that the number of nicotinic receptors in the brain are reduced in Alzheimer's disease, even in the absence of a general decrease in the number of neurons, and nicotinic receptor agonists are viewed as interesting targets for anti-Alzheimer drugs.

Dopamine 
Memantine was shown in a study to act as an agonist at the dopamine D2HIGH receptor with equal or slightly higher affinity than to the NMDA receptors; however, the relevance of this may be negligible, as studies have shown very low affinity for binding to D2 receptors in general.

Sigmaergic 
Memantine acts as an agonist at the σ1 receptor with a low affinity (Ki 2.6 μM). The consequences of this activity are unclear (as the role of sigma receptors in general is not yet that well understood). Due to this low affinity, therapeutic concentrations of memantine are most likely too low to have any sigmaergic effect as a typical therapeutic dose is 20 mg, however excessive doses of memantine taken for recreational purposes many times greater than prescribed doses may indeed activate this receptor.

History 

Memantine was first synthesized and patented by Eli Lilly and Company in 1968 as an anti-diabetic agent, but it was ineffective at lowering blood sugar. Later it was discovered to have central nervous system (CNS) activity, and was developed by Merz for dementia in Germany; the NMDA activity was discovered after trials had already begun. Memantine was first marketed for dementia in Germany in 1989 under the name Axura.

In the US, some CNS activities were discovered at Children's Hospital of Boston in 1990, and Children's licensed patents covering uses of memantine outside the field of ophthalmology to Neurobiological Technologies (NTI) in 1995. In 1998 NTI amended its agreement with Children's to allow Merz to take over development.

In 2000, Merz partnered with Forest to develop the drug for Alzheimer's disease in the U.S. under the name Namenda.

In 2000, Merz partnered with Suntory for the Japanese market and with Lundbeck for other markets including Europe; the drug was originally marketed by Lundbeck under the name Ebixa.

Sales of the drug reached $1.8 billion for 2014. The cost of Namenda was $269 to $489 a month in 2012.

In February 2014, as the July 2015 patent expiration for memantine neared, Actavis, which had acquired Forest, announced that it was launching an extended release (XR) form of memantine that could be taken once a day instead of twice a day as needed with the then-current "immediate release" (IR) version, and that it intended to stop selling the IR version in August 2014 and withdraw the marketing authorization. This is a tactic to thwart generic competition called "product hopping". However the supply of the XR version ran short, so Actavis extended the deadline until the fall. In September 2014 the attorney general of New York, Eric Schneiderman, filed a lawsuit to compel Actavis to keep selling the IR version on the basis of antitrust law.

In December 2014, a judge granted New York State its request and issued an injunction, preventing Actavis from withdrawing the IR version until generic versions could launch. Actavis appealed and in May a panel of the Second Circuit Court of Appeals upheld the injunction, and in June Actavis asked that its case be heard by the full Second Circuit panel. In August 2015, Actavis' request was denied.

Society and culture

Recreational use 
One preclinical study on monkeys showed that memantine was capable of inducing a PCP-like intoxication. Because of its very long biological half-life, memantine was previously thought not to be recreational, although a few cases of sporadic recreational use have been described.

A study examining self-reported use of memantine on the social network Reddit showed that the drug was used recreationally and as a nootropic, but also that it was misused in various illnesses as self-medication without strong scientific basis.

Brand names
As of August 2017, memantine was marketed under many brand names worldwide including Abixa, Adaxor, Admed, Akatinol, Alceba, Alios, Almenta, Alois, Alzant, Alzer, Alzia, Alzinex, Alzixa, Alzmenda, Alzmex, Axura, Biomentin, Carrier, Cogito, Cognomem, Conexine, Cordure, Dantex, Demantin, Demax, Dementa, Dementexa, Ebitex, Ebixa, Emantin, Emaxin, Esmirtal, Eutebrol, Evy, Ezemantis, Fentina, Korint, Lemix, Lindex, Lindex, Lucidex, Manotin, Mantine, Mantomed, Marbodin, Mardewel, Marixino, Maruxa, Maxiram, Melanda, Memabix, Memamed, Memando, Memantin, Memantina, Memantine, Mémantine, Memantinol, Memantyn, Memanvitae, Memanxa, Memanzaks, Memary, Memax, Memexa, Memigmin, Memikare, Memogen, Memolan, Memorel, Memorix, Memotec, Memox, Memxa, Mentikline, Mentium, Mentixa, Merandex, Merital, Mexia, Mimetix, Mirvedol, Modualz, Morysa, Namenda, Nemdatine, Nemdatine, Nemedan, Neumantine, Neuro-K, Neuroplus, Noojerone, Polmatine, Prilben, Pronervon, Ravemantine, Talentum, Timantila, Tingreks, Tonibral, Tormoro, Valcoxia, Vilimen, Vivimex, Witgen, Xapimant, Ymana, Zalatine, Zemertinex, Zenmem, Zenmen, and Zimerz.

It was also marketed in some countries as a combination drug with donepezil under the brands Namzaric, Neuroplus Dual, and Tonibral MD.

Research

Psychiatry 
Memantine, in light of its NMDA receptor antagonism, has been repurposed as a possible adjunctive treatment for depressive episodes in subjects with bipolar disorder, considering the involvement of the glutamatergic system in the pathophysiology of bipolar illness. However, evidence from meta-analyses showed that memantine was not significantly superior to placebo for bipolar depression.

Parkinson's 
A phase III clinical trial is studying the potential of memantine as disease modifying treatment for Parkinson's disease, to slow progression of the disease.

References

Further reading

External links 
 

Adamantanes
Antidementia agents
AbbVie brands
Antiparkinsonian agents
Amines
Dissociative drugs
NMDA receptor antagonists
Sigma agonists
Treatment of Alzheimer's disease
Wikipedia medicine articles ready to translate